The 2002 New Zealand rugby league tour of Great Britain and France was a tour by the New Zealand national rugby league team. The New Zealand national rugby league team drew the series 1-all against Great Britain and also defeated Wales and France.

Background 
This was the Kiwis first tour of Great Britain since the 2000 World Cup, the Kangaroos having toured Great Britain the previous year.

The original squad named in September included Nathan Cayless, Craig Smith and Tevita Vaikona who all later had to withdraw from the final squad.

Before the tour started the Prime Minister of New Zealand, Helen Clark, held an official reception for the team at the Beehive. It was the first New Zealand rugby league tour to receive an official farewell from a Prime Minister in Parliament.

The tour was opened against Hull F.C. at The Boulevard, the same ground had hosted the first Test matched played by the 1907 New Zealand team. This match was the last international played at the ground, while the 1907 team had played in the first.

Motu Tony broke his hand in the match against England A and was ruled out of the rest of the tour. Steve Clark refereed all three Test matches against Great Britain.

Former Kiwis player Sean Hoppe, who had not represented his country since 1999, was given the honour of captaining St Helens R.F.C. in a tour match against the Kiwis. The match was meant to be his last before retirement however he was later called into the touring squad due to injuries and his final two matches were test matches against Great Britain and France. Hoppe was called up over Lesley Vainikolo who was also considered as a replacement after injuries to several backs including Motu Tony and Clinton Toopi.

In the end Great Britain tied the series, taking the inaugural Baskerville Shield as hosts. The third test match was Great Britain's first win over New Zealand since 1993.

Squad 
Kiwis captain Nathan Cayless withdrew due to suspension and was replaced by Andrew Lomu while Willie Talau required surgery and was unavailable. After the Australia Test both Lomu and Matt Utai were withdrawn by their clubs for off-season surgery. On arriving in England, English based players Craig Smith and Tevita Vaikona were ruled out due to injury. Later Motu Tony and Robbie Paul were sidelined with injuries and in France Richard Swain left to sign a deal with the Broncos and Stephen Kearney flew home due to a family illness.

Clinton Toopi broke his hand in a scuffle with Nigel Vagana during a team drinking session after the second test. Freeman and team management initially tried to cover up the incident, claiming the injury occurred during the match, before media found out and had a field day.

 Coach: Gary Freeman

Fixtures 
The New Zealand side played five test matches while on their European tour and one test in New Zealand before leaving.

New Zealand vs Australia

British leg 

Hull: Steve Prescott, Paul Parker, Richard Horne, Graham Mackay, Matt Crowther, Jason Smith (c), Tony Smith, Craig Greenhill, Lee Jackson, Scott Logan, Adam Maher, Sean Ryan, Chris Chester. Res: Craig Poucher, Paul Cooke, Richard Fletcher, Paul King. Coach: Shaun McRae

New Zealand: David Vaealiki, Francis Meli, Nigel Vagana, Clinton Toopi, Henry Fa'afili, Motu Tony, Lance Hohaia, Jason Cayless, Monty Betham, Paul Rauhihi, Tony Puletua, Ruben Wiki, Logan Swann. Res: Michael Smith, Richard Swain, Awen Guttenbeil, Stephen Kearney

Wales vs New Zealand

Baskerville Shield 
After 30 New Zealand vs England / Great Britain test series since 1907, the Baskerville Shield was inaugurated for series between New Zealand and England / Great Britain. The shield is named in honour of Albert Henry Baskerville who organised New Zealand's first ever tour of Great Britain in 1907.

Venues 
The three Baskerville Shield tests took place at the following venues.

1st Test 

Henry Fa'afili scored three tries in the 30–16 first test win over Great Britain at Ewood Park, the first Kiwis hat-trick against the Lions in 97 matches dating back to 1907. His tries all came in the second half as the Kiwis rallied from a 10–6 halftime deficit to win comfortably.

2nd Test

3rd Test

France vs New Zealand

Aftermath 
New Zealand halfback Stacey Jones won the George Smith Medal as player of the series against Great Britain.
The tour was Freeman's last as head coach. In 2003 Daniel Anderson was named as the new Kiwis coach.

References 

New Zealand national rugby league team tours
Rugby league tours of Great Britain
Rugby league tours of France
Tour of Great Britain and France
New Zealand rugby league tour of Great Britain and France
New Zealand rugby league tour of Great Britain and France
New Zealand rugby league tour of Great Britain and France